Pilodius is a genus of crabs in the family Xanthidae, containing the following species:

Pilodius areolatus H. Milne-Edwards, 1834)
Pilodius cephalalgicus Clark & Galil, 1993
Pilodius consors Clark & Galil, 1993
Pilodius flavus Rathbun, 1894
Pilodius granulatus Stimpson, 1858
Pilodius maotieni Serène, 1971
Pilodius miersi (Ward, 1936)
Pilodius moranti Clark & Galil, 1993
Pilodius nigrocrinitus Stimpson, 1859
Pilodius paumotensis Rathbun, 1907
Pilodius philippinensis (Ward, 1941)
Pilodius pilumnoides (White, 1848)
Pilodius pubescens Dana, 1852
Pilodius pugil Dana, 1852
Pilodius scabriculus Dana, 1852
Pilodius spinipes Heller, 1861

References

Xanthoidea